P89 may refer to:
 DLR P89 stock, a passenger train
 , a patrol boat of the Royal Australian Navy
 Northrop XP-89, an American prototype fighter aircraft
 Papyrus 89, a biblical manuscript
 Ruger P89, a pistol
 P89, a state regional road in Latvia